Oliver Lawrence Barrett (October 8, 1892 – August 7, 1943) was a Pacific Northwest sculptor.

Notable works include the (no longer extant) Theodore Roosevelt Memorial and Rebecca at the Well, part of the Shemanski Fountain. He sculpted the marine figure at the Battleship Oregon Memorial Park in Portland, Oregon.

Barrett was a professor at the University of Oregon until his sudden death in 1943.

References

1892 births
1943 deaths
American sculptors
Artists from Oregon
University of Oregon faculty
Federal Art Project artists